Nikos Hadjikyriakos-Ghikas (February 26, 1906 – September 3, 1994), also known as Niko Ghika, was a leading Greek painter, sculptor, engraver, writer and academic.  He was a founding member of the Association of Greek Art Critics, AICA-Hellas, International Association of Art Critics.

He studied ancient and Byzantine art as well as folk art due to his adoration for the Greek landscape. During his youth he was exposed in Paris to the avant-garde European artistic trends and he gained recognition as the leading Greek cubist artist.

His aim was to focus on the harmony and purity of Greek art and to deconstruct the Greek landscape and intense natural light into simple geometric shapes and interlocking planes.

His works are featured in the National Gallery (Athens), the Musée d'Art Moderne de la Ville de Paris, the Tate Gallery in London, the Metropolitan Museum of New York and in private collections worldwide.

Biography
Hadjikyriakos-Ghikas was born in Athens in 1906. His father was the admiral Alexandros Hadjikyriakos, and his mother Princess Eleni Ghika. His father During his teen years (1918–1922) his family recognised the potential of  his talent and arranged for him to study painting with the artist Parthenis. In 1923 he went to Paris to study French Literature and Aesthetics at the Sorbonne University. Picasso himself noticed and commented the works of the young Greek artist.

In 1933 he organised in Athens the 4th International Architectural Symposium. In 1934 he arranged another exhibition of his paintings and sculptures in the Gallerie des Cahiers d' Art and in the international exhibitions of Paris and Venice. From 1935 to 1937  he was co-editor of the art magazine 3rd Eye. In 1941 he was offered a position in the Architectural School of the National Technical University of Athens. In 1949 he formed, with other artists including Yiannis Moralis, Yannis Tsarouchis, Nikos Nikolaou, Nikos Engonopoulos and Panayiotis Tetsis, the "Armos" art group.  In 1950 he was the Greek participant at the Venice Biennale where he exhibited 17 of his paintings.

During 1950-1968  he organised twelve exhibitions in Athens, Paris, London (Whitechapel Gallery), Berlin, Geneva and New York.

In 1961 he married Barbara Hutchinson, who had previously been married to Victor Rothschild, 3rd Baron Rothschild and to classicist Rex Warner.

In 1973 he became a member of the Athens Academy and in 1986 a member of the Royal Academy in London. He was also a member of  the Tiberiana Academy in Rome and was granted the title of Officier des Arts et des Lettres from the French government.

In 1988 he had his last exhibition at the Royal Academy of London. His wife, Barbara, died in 1989.  He died on September 3, 1994, in Athens.

 Today in Greece he is celebrated as one of the most important modern Greek painters. His house has been converted to a museum and is being run by the Benaki Museum. In 2018, the British Museum hosted an exhibition which focuses on the friendship of Ghika, the artist John Craxton, and the writer Patrick Leigh Fermor; their shared love of Greece was fundamental to their work.

References

Further reading
 Derycke, Jean-Pierre. "Ghikas and avant-garde in interwar Europe" (Ephesos Press, Athens 2004) Benaki Museum.
 
 Loukaki, Argyro. Cultural and Physical Space as a Condition of Artistic Vision: The Aegean in Greek Artists Maleas, Ghikas and Tetsis, in Actual Problems of Theory and History of Art: Collection of articles. Vol. 8. Ed. S. V. Mal’tseva, E. Iu. Staniukovich-Denisova, A. V. Zakharova.  St. Petersburg, St. Petersburg Univ. Press, 2018, pp. 476–484. ISSN 2312-2129.
 
 "Drawings by Nikos Chatzikyriakos-Ghikas for Kazantzakis' Odyssey" (ADAM Press, Athens 1990). Nikos Chatzikyriakos-Ghikas Gallery, Benaki Museum.
 "DIMITRIS PIKIONIS 1887 - 1968", (Bastas-Plessas Publications, Athens 1994).
 'Contemporary Relations between Painting, Sculpture, Architecture', Ghika, X magazine, Vol. 1, No. 1, Nov 1959; A Pine Tree; The Innermost Flesh of Vital Space, Ghika, X magazine, Vol. 2, No. 2, August 1961.

External links

Museums
  Benaki Museum (English)
 Municipal Gallery of Chania
 Municipal Gallery of Rhodes
 Municipal Gallery of Chios

Online galleries
  Paleta Online Gallery
 British Government Art Collection
 Online Gallery of the Cultural Centre Artopos

1906 births
1994 deaths
Greek art critics
Members of the Academy of Athens (modern)
Greek icon painters
20th-century Greek painters
Officiers of the Ordre des Arts et des Lettres
University of Paris alumni
Artists from Athens
Honorary Members of the Royal Academy
Academic staff of the National Technical University of Athens